The 1888 United States presidential election in Missouri took place on November 6, 1888, as part of the 1888 United States presidential election. Voters chose 16 representatives, or electors to the Electoral College, who voted for president and vice president.

Missouri voted for the Democratic nominee, incumbent President Grover Cleveland, over the Republican nominee, Benjamin Harrison. Cleveland won the state by a margin of 4.93%.

Results

See also
 United States presidential elections in Missouri

Notes

References

Missouri
1888
1888 Missouri elections